Grapholita isacma is a moth of the family Tortricidae first described by Edward Meyrick in 1907. It is found in Sri Lanka and India.

References

Moths of Asia
Moths described in 1907